Marco Antonio Trejo León (born December 8, 1958, in Mexico City) is a Mexican football manager and former player.

External links

1958 births
Living people
Footballers from Mexico City
Mexican football managers
Mexican footballers
Association footballers not categorized by position